Natasha Zouves is an Emmy-Award winning American broadcast journalist. She is a network anchor and reporter at NewsNation. She was honored as a John S. Knight Journalism Fellow at Stanford, and holds a masters from Johns Hopkins in Biotechnology Enterprise & Entrepreneurship. Zouves was previously a news anchor and reporter for KGO-TV (ABC7 News) in San Francisco, California.

Early life and education
Zouves grew up in the San Francisco Bay Area. She and her family have been profoundly touched by her brother having autism. She is of Greek and Chinese descent.

In 2012, she completed a B.A. and B.S. at the University of Southern California, where she was a Renaissance Scholar and graduated Phi Beta Kappa and magna cum laude from the USC Annenberg School for Communication and Journalism, with a double major in Broadcast Journalism and Health Promotion & Disease Prevention.

In 2020, Zouves completed a master of science in Biotechnology Enterprise and Entrepreneurship from Johns Hopkins University.

Professional career

Zouves worked at San Diego's KGTV (10News-ABC) from 2013 to late in the summer of 2015, as both a reporter and an anchor.

In July 2015 she was hired to work as a reporter and anchor for San Francisco's KGO-ABC7 News. She and Reggie Aqui started anchoring the morning show on December 21, 2015.

In addition to her role as a news anchor, her reporting work encompassed topics such as the housing crisis’s effect on domestic violence survivors’ ability to leave their abusers. She highlighted stories of resilience, bringing together two men who jumped from the Golden Gate Bridge and survived. Her storytelling at KGO-ABC7 News was honored with two Emmy Awards.

Zouves sustained a serious concussion shortly after finishing a newscast in 2018, recovering and returning to work in early 2019. She writes of the experience, "I am hopeful that, by opening up about the details of my injury and recovery, I'm able to shed some light and awareness and let others know they're not alone." She recounted the experience in a Medium post.

In September 2019, Zouves left ABC7 News, having been selected for the John S. Knight Fellowship at Stanford University.

Zouves is currently a network news anchor and investigative reporter at NewsNation, a fledgling start-up cable news network.

Social media
In an interview Zouves mentioned how "Social media and the web is such a big part of what we do." She uses Facebook and Instagram to both provide people with more access to the news and also so she can keep in touch with the community.

She is involved in the community and has participated and served as an MC in many events, such as kicking off the March of Dimes March for Babies walk in San Francisco. She emceed the Leukemia and Lymphoma Society's Light the Night event in San Francisco, which raised more than $2 million to find a cure for blood cancer. She has also been heavily involved with the Special Olympics, and has emceed multiple events.

Awards
In 2015, Zouves received an Emmy in San Diego. She received two further Emmys in June 2018, for feature news report, light series and for news writing.

Trivia
When Zouves worked at KGTV in San Diego, she was voted "Hottest San Diego News Girl" by the radio station 93.3 in late 2014.

In November 2014, while she was covering a story, a minor crash occurred immediately behind her as the cameras were rolling.

References

External links
 ABC7 News Bio

American television journalists
American women television journalists
People from the San Francisco Bay Area
University of Southern California alumni
Living people
News & Documentary Emmy Award winners
American people of Greek descent
American people of Chinese descent
Year of birth missing (living people)
Johns Hopkins University alumni
Stanford University Knight Fellows
21st-century American women